The Alcuin Club is an Anglican organization seeking to preserve or restore church ceremony, arrangement, ornament, and practice in an orthodox manner.

The organization was founded in 1897 and named after Alcuin of York. It was a reorganization of an earlier group, the Society of St Osmund, which was formed in 1889. The Alcuin Club's first publication, English Altars by W. H. St. John Hope, appeared in 1899. The club is dedicated to the Book of Common Prayer and conformity to its exact rubric.

The club was active in the debate over the rewriting of the Book of Common Prayer in the 1920s. Its influence faded somewhat after the first part of the century and it is now dedicated to studying ceremony of all Christian churches. 
The club's members are active in the liturgical researches of the Anglican churches. The club has 450 members, with over half being in the United Kingdom and many in the United States.

The Alcuin Club selects works on liturgy and ceremony and hagiography every year to include in its collections.

See also

 E. G. Cuthbert F. Atchley
 Edward C. Ratcliff
 Warham Guild

References

External links
 
 Selected bibliography from Project Canterbury

Anglican organizations
Anglo-Catholicism
Text publication societies
Religious organizations established in 1897